Astex Pharmaceuticals ("Astex") is a biotechnology company focused on the discovery and development of drugs in oncology and diseases of the central nervous system. Astex was founded in 1999 by Sir Tom Blundell, Chris Abell & Harren Jhoti, and is located in Cambridge, England.

Astex is part of the Otsuka group of companies and is a wholly-owned subsidiary of Otsuka Pharmaceutical Co. Ltd, headquartered in Tokyo, Japan.

History 
Astex was founded as “Astex Technology Limited” in 1999 in Cambridge, UK, to pioneer a novel approach to small molecule drug discovery known as ‘fragment-based drug discovery’ (FBDD). Its proprietary drug discovery platform, Pyramid™, can effectively identify novel small molecule drugs for key disease targets. Originally funded by venture capital, from a number of investors including Abingworth, Advent international, Oxford Bioscience Partners, Apax Partners and Gimv. Astex established strategic partnerships with major pharmaceutical companies including AstraZeneca, Novartis, Janssen Pharmaceuticals and GlaxoSmithKline.

In 2005, the Company changed its name to Astex Therapeutics Limited when its first product entered clinical development. In 2011, Astex Therapeutics Limited and SuperGen, Inc. (US) merged. Following the acquisition, SuperGen, Inc. changed its name to Astex Pharmaceuticals, Inc., and began trading under the ticker symbol ASTX on NASDAQ. The combined Astex entities were subsequently acquired by Otsuka Pharmaceutical in October 2013 for around USD $900 million, and now operate as part of the Otsuka group as wholly-owned subsidiaries.

Astex currently operates from two sites:

 European Corporate and Research headquarters in Cambridge, UK (Astex Therapeutics Limited)
 US Corporate and Clinical Development headquarters in Pleasanton, California, USA (Astex Pharmaceuticals Inc.)

Research and development 
Astex is focused on precision medicine for oncology and central nervous system disorders. This approach involves first understanding the molecular basis of a disease and then developing a targeted therapy which can arrest or reverse its progression.

Astex’s Pyramid™ platform assists with the rational design of novel small molecule targeted therapies. These therapies are based on the use of biophysical techniques, principally X-ray crystallography, to screen and identify very small, low molecular weight fragments of drugs binding into the disease target of interest. Astex uses its knowledge of the 3-dimensional structure of the binding interaction between the compound and the target to design and grow from the initial fragment, adding further functionality to improve the binding interaction so that the final drug compound interacts optimally with the disease target – either through inhibition or activation.

In 2020, Astex and Taiho Pharmaceutical Co., Ltd. entered into a new partnership with Merck & Co., Inc., Kenilworth, New Jersey, USA (known as MSD outside the USA and Canada) through a subsidiary, and this partnership was extended in 2021.

Clinical pipeline 
Astex has a pipeline of investigational compounds currently in various stages of clinical development.

Several compounds from drug discovery collaborations with Astex have been advanced by Astex’s biopharma partners into clinical trials and onto the market, including ribociclib (brand name “Kisqali”), a CDK4/CDK6 inhibitor discovered in collaboration with Novartis, subsequent to an original collaboration on FGFR inhibitors between Astex and Newcastle University, that was granted approval in the US and EU in 2017 for the treatment of breast cancer. Erdafitinib (brand name “Balversa”) is an FGFR inhibitor that was discovered with Janssen Pharmaceuticals (a subsidiary of Johnson & Johnson), and received FDA market approval for the treatment of metastatic urothelial carcinoma in 2019.

References

Further reading 
Astex Pharmaceuticals website

Companies formerly listed on the Nasdaq
Pharmaceutical companies of England
1999 establishments in England
Otsuka Pharmaceutical